Dacalana akayamai is a butterfly of the family Lycaenidae first described by Hisakazu Hayashi, Heinz G. Schroeder and Colin G. Treadaway in 1983. It is endemic to the Philippine island of Mindanao.

References

 , 1983: Neue Arten und Unterarten der Gattungen Dacalana und Pratapa von den Philippinen (Insecta: Lepidoptera: Lycaenidae).: Senckenbergiana Biologica. 63 (1/2): 47-59.
, 1995. Checklist of the butterflies of the Philippine Islands (Lepidoptera: Rhopalocera) Nachrichten des Entomologischen Vereins Apollo Suppl.14: 7-118.

 , 2012: Revised checklist of the butterflies of the Philippine Islands (Lepidoptera: Rhopalocera). Nachrichten des Entomologischen Vereins Apollo, Suppl. 20: 1-64.

Butterflies described in 1983
Dacalana